Felix Vernon McLaurin (September 6, 1921 – May 19, 1972) was an American Negro league outfielder in the 1940s.

A native of Jacksonville, Florida, McLaurin made his Negro leagues debut in 1942 for the Jacksonville Red Caps and the Birmingham Black Barons. He played for Birmingham for two more seasons, and was the team's starting center fielder in the 1943 and 1944 Negro World Series. McLaurin went on to play for the New York Black Yankees. He died in Chicago, Illinois in 1972 at age 50.

References

External links
 and Seamheads

1921 births
1972 deaths
Birmingham Black Barons players
Jacksonville Red Caps players
New York Black Yankees players
Baseball outfielders
Baseball players from Jacksonville, Florida
20th-century African-American sportspeople